The Micronautix Triton is an American 3-5 passenger sightseeing and flight experience aircraft.

Design and development
The Triton is a single engine pusher aircraft with three fuselage sections joined by a mid-wing and a Double-V shaped tailplane. Amphibian and electric hybrid variants are planned. A ballistic parachute will be integrated into the design. Under development by Micronautix, a division of Bob Smith Industries, Inc.

Specifications (Triton)

See also
North American Rockwell OV-10 Bronco Twin-boom retractable turboprop

Aircraft Masterpiece http://luxebeatmag.com/wp-content/uploads/2014/06/Triton.pdfJetGala Magazine https://web.archive.org/web/20141107233317/http://www.jetgala.com/downloads/PDF-Jetgala-Magazine-Issue-21.pdfhttp://www.bsi-inc.com/triton.html

References

Single-engined pusher aircraft